Ignacio "Iñaki" Peña Sotorres (born 2 March 1999) is a Spanish professional footballer who plays as a goalkeeper for La Liga club Barcelona.

Club career

Barcelona
Born in Alicante, Valencian Community, Peña started his career at Alicante CF's youth setup in 2004, aged just five. In 2012, at the age of 13, he joined FC Barcelona's La Masia from Villarreal CF. He was in the team that won the 2017–18 UEFA Youth League, being a starter in the final against Chelsea.

On 16 April 2018, Peña renewed his contract with Barça for three seasons, with an option for a further two. He was later promoted to the reserves in Segunda División B ahead of the 2018–19 season, and made his senior debut on 6 October 2018 by starting in a 1–1 home draw against CD Atlético Baleares.

On 30 October 2018, Peña was called up to the main squad for the first leg of round of 32 tie with Cultural Leonesa in the Copa del Rey as a backup to Jasper Cillessen, being an unused substitute in the 1–0 away win. He also appeared on the bench for some occasions during the season as Cillessen and starter Marc-André ter Stegen were out injured.

Peña once again featured on the bench for the main squad during the 2019–20 campaign, to cover for Neto's absence due to injury. On 6 October 2020, Barcelona exercised the option on Peña's contract to extend it for a further two years.

Loan to Galatasaray
On 31 January 2022, Peña joined Galatasaray on loan for the remainder of the season. He made his professional debut in the Süper Lig on 6 February in a 1–1 draw at Alanyaspor under former Barcelona assistant Domènec Torrent, He had a record of two draws and as many wins before club icon Fernando Muslera began his return from injury; by the second half of March, after elimination from the UEFA Europa League by Barcelona, the Uruguayan won his place back.

Return to Barcelona
Peña returned to Barcelona as his loan deal expired, and made his official first team debut under manager Xavi in a 4–2 away win over Viktoria Plzeň in the UEFA Champions League on 1 November 2022.

On 3 January 2023, Peña was registered as a first team player, and was handed the number 13 shirt left vacant by Neto, who had left for AFC Bournemouth.

International career
Peña represented Spain at under-16, under-17, under-18, under-19 and under-21 levels, earning a combined total of 30 caps. He was a runner-up in the 2016 UEFA European Under-17 Championship, being a first-choice throughout the tournament. His sole under-21 appearance was on 12 November 2020 against the Faroe Islands in Marbella, coming on at half time for Álvaro Fernández in a 2–0 win in qualification for the following year's European Championship.

Due to the isolation of some national team players following the positive COVID-19 test of Sergio Busquets, Spain's under-21 squad were called up for the international friendly against Lithuania on 8 June 2021. However, Peña did not play.

Career statistics

Honours
Barcelona Youth

UEFA Youth League: 2017–18

Barcelona
Copa del Rey: 2020–21
Supercopa de España: 2022–23

Spain U17
UEFA European Under-17 Championship runner-up: 2016

References

External links 

 Profile at the FC Barcelona website
 
 

1999 births
Living people
Footballers from Alicante
Spanish footballers
Association football goalkeepers
FC Barcelona Atlètic players
Galatasaray S.K. footballers
FC Barcelona players
Segunda División B players
Primera Federación players
Süper Lig players
Spain youth international footballers
Spain under-21 international footballers
Spanish expatriate footballers
Expatriate footballers in Turkey
Spanish expatriate sportspeople in Turkey